Journal of the Travellers' Aid Society is a role-playing game magazine devoted to Traveller, commonly abbreviated JTAS.

History
In 1979 Loren K. Wiseman created a magazine to support Traveller, which resulted in Game Designers' Workshop'sThe Journal of the Travellers' Aid Society (JTAS), which Wiseman would further develop as editor over its history. J. Andrew Keith's writing for JTAS was so extensive that he had to take the pseudonyms John Marshal and Keith Douglass (he was later 'caught' when a reader did a word-use analysis of his articles and determined that they were all written by the same person). Marc Miller decided that, rather than using modern dates for the magazine, each issue would instead be based on the in-game Imperium's calendar, and the calendar advanced about 90 days every quarterly issue. JTAS #2 (1979) began printing excerpts from the 'Traveller News Service', which provided information on 'current' events in the Imperium; that issue, dated 274–1105, offered two news excerpts from Regina sector, dated 097-1105 and 101–1105. JTAS #9 (1981) GDW developed their metaplot for Traveller by describing the start of a war with an alien species named the Zhodani.  GDW's original magazine ended with The Journal of the Travellers' Aid Society #24 (1984); it was soon replaced with a new magazine, Challenge, which continued JTAS' numbering with issue #25 (1986) but covered all of GDW's games, not just Traveller.

Imperium Games published Journal of the Travellers' Aid Society #25 in 1996, and published their second and final issue of the Journal of the Travellers' Aid Society in 1997.

After Steve Jackson Games licensed the Traveller setting, Journal of the Travellers' Aid Society was resurrected as an online magazine in 2000.

Mongoose Publishing produced six volumes of Journal of the Travellers' Aid Society in 2020 as part of their Traveller licence.

Name
The Journal of the Travellers Aid Society takes its name from the fictional Travellers' Aid Society (TAS) that was first mentioned in the original incarnation of the Traveller game published by Game Designers Workshop [GDW].  In the original Traveller game, it was not too uncommon for characters to obtain membership in the TAS during character creation.  The idea of the TAS is that it is an organization that exists to support what are basically 'transients,' or 'wanderers' ['Travellers' in the game's terminology] around the galaxy.  It does so by maintaining low-cost hostels at many of the large starports, and, most importantly, by maintaining its 'rating system,' which warns of the dangers inherent in visiting certain worlds.  Under this system, a world which should be approached with caution is denoted an 'Amber Zone,' and a world that should not be approached at all is denoted a 'Red Zone.'
x§

Issues

GDW
 01 Annic Nova (1979) 
 02 Victoria (1979) 
 03 Asteroids (1979) 
 04 Gazelle Class Close Escorts (1980) 
 05 Imperium (1980) 
 06 Scouts (1980) 
 07 Starports (1981) 
 08 Broadsword Class Mercenary Cruisers (1981) 
 09 WAR! (1981) 
 10 Planet Building (1981) 
 11 Striker (1981) 
 12 Merchant Prince, including Special Supplement 1, Merchant Prince (1982 
 13 Hivers (1982) 
 14 Laws and Lawbreakers (1982) 
 15 Azun (1983) 
 16 SuSAG (1983) 
 17 Atmospheres , including Special Supplement 2, Atmospheres (1983) 
 18 Travelling without Jumping (1983) 
 19 Skyport Authority (1983) 
 20 Prologue (1984) 
 21 Vargr, including Special Supplement 3: Missiles in Traveller (1984) 
 22 Port to Jumppoint (1985) 
 23 Zhodani Philosophies (1985) 
 24 Religion in the 2000 Worlds (1985) 
 Best of JTAS Volume 1 Issues 1-4 (1981) 
 Best of JTAS Volume 2 Issues 5-8 (1980)  
 Best of JTAS Volume 3 Issues 9-12 (1982) 
 Best of JTAS Volume 4 Issues 13-16 (1983)

GDW JTAS in Challenge Magazine
 Challenge Magazine 25 Fleet Escort Lisiani (1986) 
 Challenge Magazine 26 Cargo (A Merchant Prince Variant) (1986) 
 Challenge Magazine 27 Grandfather's Worlds (1986) 
 Challenge Magazine 28 K'kree Starships (1987) 
 Challenge Magazine 29 The Sabmiqys (1987) 
 Challenge Magazine 30 The Fall of the Imperium (1987) 
 Challenge Magazine 31 Hazardous Cargoes (1987) 
 Challenge Magazine 32 A World On Its Own (1988) 
 Challenge Magazine 33 IRIS 1 (1988) 
 Challenge Magazine 34 IRIS 2 (1988) 
 Challenge Magazine 35 The Spice of Life (1988)
 Challenge Magazine 36 IRIS 3 (1988)

Imperium Games T4 - Marc Miller's Traveller
 Journal of the Travellers' Aid Society #25 (1996) 
 Journal of the Travellers' Aid Society #26 (1997)

GURPS Traveller The Best of JTAS - Steve Jackson Games
 The Best of JTAS, Volume 1 (2000)

Far Future Enterprises
These are collections of the earlier GDW publications.
 Journal of the Travellers Aid Society Issues #1-12
 Journal of the Travellers Aid Society Issues #13-24 
 Journal of the Travellers Aid Society Issues #25-33 (2004)

Reception
The Journal of the Travellers Aid Society won the H.G. Wells award for Best Magazine Covering Roleplaying of 1979.

William A. Barton reviewed the "Merchant Prince" supplement from Journal of the Travellers Aid Society #12 in The Space Gamer No. 53. Barton commented that "Although it probably won't totally supplant Merchants & Merchandise as the book for generating merchant characters, Merchant Prince is a well-conceived and viable alternative to M&M.  Its inclusion in the Journal makes it a special bargain.  I recommend it to every Traveller player, especially those who find the merchant life the most appealing."

References

External links
 JTAS web magazine

Magazines established in 1979
Origins Award winners
Role-playing game magazines
Traveller (role-playing game)